Jaime Humberto Romero Moran (2 April 1993 – 3 January 2015 in Guadalajara) was a Mexican male artistic gymnast, representing his nation at international competitions. He competed at the 2013 World Artistic Gymnastics Championships in Antwerp, Belgium.

In January 2015 he was shot dead. Romero Morán and a friend, Raul Trejo Santos, 23, were having a discussion outside Lienzo Charro Zermeño in Guadalajara, Jalisco, when they were attacked by a group of armed men, who fled after killing the two.

References

1993 births
Mexican male artistic gymnasts
2015 deaths
People murdered in Mexico
Deaths by firearm in Mexico
Male murder victims
Mexican murder victims
Place of birth missing
21st-century Mexican people